Runfire Cappadocia Ultramarathon, shortly RFC, is an international multiday ultramarathon event of desert concept that takes place mostly across the historic Cappadocia region in central Turkey. The event is run  in the provinces Nevşehir and Aksaray in six days. The Runfire Cappadocia Ultramarathon was established in 2012 taking place on July 7–15. It is considered a race of high-degree difficulty. The event is organized by Argos Culture & Arts.

The route starts in front of the Uçhisar Town Hall in Nevşehir. Following the Valley of Pigeons (Güvercinlik Vadisi), Ortahisar, Acıgöl, Damsa Dam, Analipsis Monastery (Yüksekli Kilise), Güzelyurt, Avanos, Ihlara Valley, Mount Hasan and around Lake Tuz before crossing through Çavuşin and the Ürgüp and Göreme valleys, the marathon ends in Üçhisar, where it started.

The event is accredited by Ultra-Trail du Mont-Blanc, one of the world’s most prestigious marathons. Finishers are awarded four points, which entitle them to participate at the world’s major ultramarathons. The International Association of Ultrarunners (IAU) included the RFC in its competition calendar, and titled it a bronze-label event in 2013.

At the first race in 2012, some 60 local and foreign athletes of both gender took part, among them ultra runners from Denmark, France, Italy, Russia and South Africa.

Winners
Key:

References

Gallery

Ultramarathons
Multiday races
Cappadocia
Nevşehir Province
Aksaray Province
Sport in Nevşehir
Sport in Aksaray
2012 establishments in Turkey
Annual events in Turkey
Marathons in Turkey
Recurring sporting events established in 2012
Summer events in Turkey